Tony Ward (Arabic: طوني ورد, born March 27, 1970, in Beirut, Lebanon) is a Lebanese-Italian fashion designer. Named “The Architect of Detail”, he draws his inspiration from contemporary architecture.

Early life 
Tony Ward, son of Elie Ward, a couturier based in Beirut, was interested in fashion at a young age. At 18, he enrolled in the Ecole de la Chambre Syndicale de la Couture Parisienne in Paris, France. He worked with Claude Montana at Lanvin, then with Gianfranco Ferré at Dior, then with Karl Lagerfeld at Chloé, where he studied haute couture before he launched his own brand Tony Ward Couture. Ward transformed his family's couture house, established by his father in 1952, into an international brand. He creates Couture, Ready to Wear and Bridal Collections.

Career 

After working in Paris, Tony Ward came back to his home country and launched his own couture line in 1997, for which he was awarded 1st prize at the "Société des Artistes et Décorateurs" (SAD) design competition, and his drawings were exhibited at the Musée Galliéra (The Fashion Museum of the city of Paris).

In 2004, Tony Ward started presenting his couture fashion shows in Rome. His first collection, entitled "Eden," gained the attention of the Italian and international press, high society and celebrities. He was then named Fashion Designer of the Year at the "L’Ago D’Oro" (Golden Needle) awards and by 2007, Tony Ward Couture Collections had attracted VIPs from all around the world. The increasing demand for his creations led to the opening of an exclusive showroom in Moscow.

In 2013, his collection "Frozen Memories" was presented in Moscow at The Mercedes-Benz Fashion Week. The models were the Beauty Queens participating in the Miss Universe 2013 Pageant and walked down the runway wearing Tony Ward Couture creations.
After ten years of releasing his collections in Rome during Italian Fashion week, Tony Ward chose in 2014 to start presenting in Paris.

In 2014, Tony Ward was picked to dress the 12 finalists of the Miss France 2015 elections during a live show on French channel TF1. Miss France 2015 Camille Cerf and Miss France 2010 Malika Menard were also wearing Tony Ward designs during the event.

Headquarters 

After celebrating the 60th birthday of the historical Ward Atelier, Tony Ward Couture moved to its new headquarters on Hôtel-Dieu Avenue in Beirut, Lebanon. The building houses the boutique, couture salons, offices, and ateliers.

Museum displays
A gown worn by Whitney Houston for The BET Honors in 2010 was part of a temporary exhibit at the Grammy Museum.

Also, the dress worn by Pink at the Grammy Awards was displayed at the Limited/Unlimited exhibition for the AltaRomAltaModa fashion event 2010 in Rome, Italy.

References

External links 
 

1970 births
Living people
Lebanese fashion designers
Wedding dress designers